is the seventh studio album by Japanese folk singer and guitarist Ichiko Aoba.  It was released via her label Hermine on December 2, 2020.  Windswept Adan marked a departure from Aoba's previously minimalist guitar instrumentation, instead using chamber folk instrumentation such as a string quartet, harp, flute, woodwinds and piano, as well as field recordings of nature. The album's music was composed and arranged in collaboration with Taro Umebayashi. Aoba described the album as a "soundtrack to a fictional movie" set on the fictional islands of Kirinaki and Adan, based on the Ryukyu Islands in Japan.

Critical reception

Windswept Adan received widespread acclaim from critics. At Metacritic, which assigns a normalized rating out of 100 to reviews from professional publications, the album received an average score of 82, based on 6 reviews, indicating 'universal acclaim'.

Sputnikmusic noted the big change in sound from Aoba's previous works. They noted, "none of this record’s fresh insertions are individually intrusive, but something is most certainly missing." They also noted Windswept Adan as being a smooth listen. Chase McMullen of Beats Per Minute called the album "by far her most ambitious work to date" and an "aquatic world to be lost within" and praised it for its denseness, serenity, and feeling of adventure. KCSB-FM explained that "what makes Windswept Adan so special is its sincere portrayal of a voyage in an ethereal land." Brendan Mattox of Bandcamp Daily mentioned the scarcity of English press on Ichiko Aoba but noted "with much of Aoba’s previous work, emotion transcends language" and "listeners don’t need to know the words in order to feel their emotional resonance".

The album gained further attention from reviewers outside of Japan following its international release in early December 2021. Shy Thompson of Pitchfork awarded the album an 8.0/10 and noted the album's strong narrative arc, writing that "as the story’s protagonist deepens her connection with nature—witnessing its beauty, destruction, and eventual rebirth—each track distinguishes itself as a chapter in that emotional journey". Emily Mackay of The Observer appreciated Aoba's calm sound, writing that "the album casts a still, soothing spell".

Windswept Adan scored high on the RateYourMusic charts for 2020.

Track listing
Track listing adopted from Spotify and tower.jp.

 Note: Tracks 9 and 13 are stylized in lower case.

References

Ichiko Aoba albums
2020 albums